Albert Mugnier (March 11, 1903 Annecy – December 10, 1974 Chamonix) was a French bobsledder who competed in the mid-1930s. At the 1936 Winter Olympics in Garmisch-Partenkirchen, he was listed in the four-man event, but did not compete.

References
1936 bobsleigh four-man results
1936 Olympic Winter Games official report. - p. 416.
Albert Mugnier's profile at Sports Reference.com

Bobsledders at the 1936 Winter Olympics
French male bobsledders
1903 births
1974 deaths
Olympic bobsledders of France
Sportspeople from Annecy